Stephen Harold Scott  (born 5 July 1964) is a Canadian neuroscientist and engineer who has made significant contributions to the field of sensorimotor neuroscience and the methods of assessing neurological function. He is a professor in both the Department of Biomedical and Molecular Sciences and the Department of Medicine at Queen's University. In 2013, he was named the GlaxoSmithKline-Canadian Institutes of Health Research (GSK-CIHR) Chair in Neurosciences at Queen's.  He is the Co-Founder and Chief Scientific Officer of Kinarm (also BKIN Technologies), the technology transfer company that commercializes and manufactures his invention the Kinarm.

Education
Scott received his Bachelor's of Applied Science in Systems Design Engineering from the University of Waterloo in 1988. He went on to complete his Masters of Applied Science in Systems Design Engineering at the University of Waterloo in 1989, and then completed his PhD in Physiology at Queen's University in 1993.

Career
Scott pursued his scientific career as a post-doctoral fellow(1993-1995) and then as a chercheur adjoint(1995-1997) at the Université de Montréal. He joined the Department of Biomedical and Molecular Sciences at Queen's University in 1997.

During his time at Queen's University, he developed the KINARM, a robotic device that objectively and quantitatively assesses the sensorimotor and cognitive impairments associated with a range of damages and diseases. The KINARM is now being sold worldwide for both basic and clinical research purposes.

His current research focuses on the use of optimal control principles during voluntary motor actions, as well as collaborating with clinical researchers to understand how robotics can improve our assessment of brain function.

Awards and honours
Scott was the 2012 recipient of the Barbara Turnbull Award, which recognizes outstanding research into spinal cord injury in Canada. He also received the Mihran and Mary Basmajian Award in 2002 for his research into the adaptive learning of the limbs.

In 2022, Scott was elected as a Fellow of the Royal Society of Canada for his work understanding the computational, neural, mechanical and behavioural aspects of voluntary motor control.

Notable Publications
 Kalaska, J.F., Scott, S.H., Cisek, P. and Sergio, L.E. (1997) Cortical control of reaching movements. Current Opinion in Neurobiology 7:849-859. DOI
Nature 413:161-165. DOI.
 Gribble, P.L. and Scott, S.H. (2002) Overlap of multiple internal models in primary motor cortex. Nature 417:938-941. DOI
 Singh, K. and Scott, S.H. (2003) A motor learning strategy reflecting neural circuitry for limb control. Nature Neuroscience 6:399-403. DOI
 Scott, S.H. and Norman, K.E. (2003) Computational approaches to motor control and their potential role for interpreting motor dysfunction. Current Opinion in Neurology 16:693-698. 
 Scott, S.H. (2004) Optimal feedback control and the neural basis of motor control. Nature Reviews Neuroscience 5:532-546. DOI
 Kurtzer, I. Herter, T.M. and Scott, S.H. (2005) Random change in cortical load representation suggests distinct control of posture and movement. Nature Neuroscience 8:498-504. DOI
 Nozaki, D., Kurtzer, I. and Scott, S.H. (2006) To learn with one limb or two? Limited transfer between unimanual and bimanual skills within the same limb. Nature Neuroscience 9:1364-1366.
 Scott, S.H. (2012) The computational and neural basis of voluntary motor control and planning. Trends in Cognitive Sciences 16:541-549. DOI

References

External links
Profile on Google Scholar
Profile on ResearchGate
Profile on Queen's University Department of Biomedical and Molecular Sciences
Neurotree

1964 births
Living people
Canadian neuroscientists
Fellows of the Royal Society of Canada